The M65 is a motorway between Preston and Colne in Lancashire, England. It runs from Bamber Bridge just south of Preston, through major junctions with the M6 and M61 motorways, east past Darwen, Blackburn, Accrington, Burnley, Brierfield, Nelson and ends at Colne.

History

The M65 was opened in the following sections:

Junctions 1a to 6 M6 to Whitebirk in 1997
Junctions 6 to 7 (Whitebirk to Accrington/Hyndburn) in 1984
Junctions 7 to 10 (Hyndburn to Burnley) in 1983
Junctions 10 to 12 (Burnley to Brierfield) in 1981
Junctions 12 to 13 (Brierfield to Nelson) in 1983
Junctions 13 to 14 (Nelson to Colne) in 1988

The first section of the motorway was opened in 1981, connecting Burnley to Brierfield. Over the years, several extensions were made, the largest being the link from Whitebirk to the M6 and M61 motorways in 1997.

This extension was the scene of a standoff between construction security workers and protesters forming part of the environmental direct action movement. Protesters occupied abandoned buildings in Darwen, parts of Stanworth Woods near Feniscowles and needed to be physically removed.

Junctions 1a to 6 were opened 18 December 1997 by Jack Straw, Home Secretary and Member of Parliament (MP) for Blackburn. The opening ceremony took place on the westbound carriageway beneath junction 5 at Guide with a heavy police presence as protesters threatened to bring a halt to the proceedings.

Much of the 1997 extension was relaid shortly after it opened with a new, quieter tarmac because the amount of road noise had been so great that it prevented birds of prey (mainly owls) from foraging effectively.

Originally, the M65 was planned to go via the town centre of Blackburn.

The motorway is maintained by National Highways up to Junction 10 with Lancashire County Council taking over responsibility from this junction until the end of the motorway at Junction 14.

Features

Unusual spur road (Walton Summit Motorway)

When the M65 was extended, a slip road was built at Walton Summit, southeast of Preston, from the roundabout linking junction 9 of the M61 with junction 2 of the M65 to the Walton Summit industrial estate. It is a single-carriageway road, with two lanes towards the junction (uphill) and one away (downhill). It is around 600 yards long and replaced an A-road spur of the A6 that was built in the 1980s.

According to the statutory instrument that authorised its construction, the road is officially classified as a 'special link road to connect the [M65/M61 roundabout] with the all-purpose road known as Tramway Lane'. According to Lancashire County Council, it is the 'M61 Link Tramway Lane to Junction 9' and is part of the M61. In 2007, the approach signs from Walton Summit were modified to read 'M61', but the signs still mark the roundabout at the eastern end.

Legislation

Each motorway in England requires that a statutory instrument be published, detailing the route of the road, before it can be built. The dates given on these statutory instruments relate to when the document was published, and not when the road was built. Provided below is an incomplete list of the Statutory Instruments relating to the route of the M65.

 Statutory Instrument 1991 No. 722: The M65 Motorway (Bamber Bridge to Whitebirk Section, Blackburn Southern Bypass) and Connecting Roads Scheme 1991. S.I. 1991/722
 Statutory Instrument 1992 No. 2651: The M65 Motorway (Bamber Bridge to Whitebirk Section, Blackburn Southern Bypass) and Connecting Roads Scheme 1991 Variation Scheme 1992. S.I. 1992/2651

Junctions

The entire route is in Lancashire.

{| class="plainrowheaders wikitable"
|-
!scope=col|Location
!scope=col|
!scope=col|
!scope=col|Junction

!scope=col|Destinations
!scope=col|Notes
|-

Coordinate list

See also
List of motorways in the United Kingdom
 Mancunian Way, another motorway with a secret number

References

External links

Roads.org.uk – M65
Pathetic Motorways – Walton Summit
UK Motorway Archive – M65
Amateur documentary of the commencement ceremony and early works at Brierfield 1976 YouTube (Pendle Movie Makers)

Motorways in England
Roads in Lancashire